The Belleville School District is a comprehensive community public school district that serves students in pre-kindergarten through twelfth grade from Belleville, in Essex County, New Jersey, United States.

As of the 2020–21 school year, the district, comprised of 11 schools, had an enrollment of 4,548 students and 361.0 classroom teachers (on an FTE basis), for a student–teacher ratio of 12.6:1.

The district is classified by the New Jersey Department of Education as being in District Factor Group "CD", the sixth-highest of eight groupings. District Factor Groups organize districts statewide to allow comparison by common socioeconomic characteristics of the local districts. From lowest socioeconomic status to highest, the categories are A, B, CD, DE, FG, GH, I and J.

Schools
Schools in the district (with 2020–21 enrollment data from the National Center for Education Statistics) are:
Preschool
Hornblower Early Childhood Center (60 students; in PreK)
Shannon Sharkey, Principal
Elementary schools
School 3 (322; K-5)
Jennifer Vernieri, Principal
School 4 (466; PreK-5)
Dora Cavallo, Principal
School 5 (375; K-5)
Mary Ann Gilligan, Principal
School 7 (404; PreK-5)
Brian E. Belton, Principal
School 8 (464; K-5)
Charles Giachetti, Principal
School 9 (124; K-5)
Joseph Rotonda, Principal
School 10 (152; K-5)
Matthew Sullivan, Principal

Middle school
Belleville Middle School (736; 6-8)
Romain Royal, Principal
High school
Belleville High School (1,358; 9-12)
Caleb Rhodes, Principal

Administration 
Core members of the district's administration are:
Dr. Richard D. Tomko, Superintendent of Schools
Matthew J. Paladino, Business Administrator / Board Secretary

Board of education
The district's board of education is comprised of seven members who set policy and oversee the fiscal and educational operation of the district through its administration. As a Type II school district, the board's trustees are elected directly by voters to serve three-year terms of office on a staggered basis, with two or three seats up for election each year held (since 2014) as part of the November general election. The board appoints a superintendent to oversee the district's day-to-day operations and a business administrator to supervise the business functions of the district.

References

External links 
Belleville School District

School Data for the Belleville School District, National Center for Education Statistics

Belleville, New Jersey
New Jersey District Factor Group CD
School districts in Essex County, New Jersey